Gary Edward Sampson (born August 24, 1959 in Atikokan, Ontario and raised in International Falls, Minnesota) is a retired American ice hockey player.

Born in Canada and raised in the United States, Sampson played college hockey at Boston College and was part of the U.S. National Hockey Team that played in the 1984 Winter Olympic Games.

Sampson signed with the Washington Capitals following the Olympics and scored his first NHL goal in a 5–1 win over the Minnesota North Stars on March 21, 1984. He played parts of four seasons with the Capitals until he retired during the 1987–88 season due to injuries.

Personal life
He resides in Alaska with his wife Jeanne where he runs the Kodiak Sportsman's Lodge.

Career statistics

Regular season and playoffs

International

References

External links

1959 births
American men's ice hockey forwards
Binghamton Whalers players
Baltimore Skipjacks players
Boston College Eagles men's ice hockey players
Canadian emigrants to the United States
Ice hockey players from Minnesota
Ice hockey people from Ontario
Ice hockey players at the 1984 Winter Olympics
Living people
Olympic ice hockey players of the United States
People from International Falls, Minnesota
People from Rainy River District
Undrafted National Hockey League players
Washington Capitals players